Oliver "Oli" James Webb (born 20 March 1991 in Manchester) is a British auto racing driver. He is a 2004 Karting Champion, 2007 Formula BMW Scholarship winner, 2010 Formula 3 competitor, 2014 European Le Mans series Champion, 2015 Dubai 24 Hour Champion, and W Motors Ambassador.

Career

Karting
Webb began his career in karting at the age of nine, progressing up through the ranks in the Greater Manchester karting scene with the help of management from British Touring Car Championship driver Michael Bentwood. With more experience, Webb started to win races at the Three Sisters Karting Circuit in Wigan, eventually winning that circuit's Mini Max Championship in 2004. He finished fourth in the Junior Max Championship in 2005, combining that with a season in T Cars.

T Cars
Webb moved into T Cars with Graham Hathaway Engineering in 2005, combining the campaign with schoolwork and his karting career. He continued into the 2005 Autumn Trophy, finishing second to Adrian Quaife-Hobbs. He finished third in the 2006 main series, winning three races, a non-championship double-header at Brands Hatch, and achieved a record seven fastest laps in a season.

Formula BMW
At the conclusion of the 2006 season, Bentwood entered Webb into the Formula BMW Scholarship Programme where drivers had the opportunity to be awarded with a financial contribution towards their racing budget, and an education and coaching programme from BMW Motorsport. Webb was one of the six chosen drivers for the scholarship, moving into Formula BMW UK in 2007. Webb drove for Carlin Motorsport, alongside Henry Surtees. Webb finished ninth in the championship, despite not finishing on the podium in any of the twenty races.

Formula Renault

He moved to the British Formula Renault Championship to compete in the Winter Series in 2007. Competing for Fortec Motorsport, Webb finished fifteenth in the four-race series, with a best race result of eleventh at Croft. Webb continued his progression up the British motorsport ladder, by moving into the main British series for the 2008 season. Staying with Fortec, Webb finished every single race in the points en route to eighth in the overall championship. His best result was fourth place at round seventeen, at Silverstone. He finished third in the Graduates Cup for first-year drivers, behind Dean Stoneman and James Calado.

Webb competed in three other Formula Renault series during the season, competing in the Northern European Cup, and the British and Portuguese Winter Series championships. In the NEC, he recorded a fourth-place finish at Spa, and added a twelfth at Zolder to wind up 25th in the standings. In the UK Winter Series, Webb finished fourth overall in the four-race series, finishing on the podium at Rockingham. A retirement in the second race cost him a top-three championship spot. Finally, he finished as runner-up to team-mate Calado in the Portuguese Winter Series, with the two taking all four victories, Calado with three and Webb with one.

In 2009, Webb returned for a second season in Formula Renault UK. Consistency was the key for Webb, as he finished all but one race of the season, winning two races at Brands Hatch and at Silverstone. Webb was never outside the top-five in the championship standings, leading the championship after fourteen races before falling behind Dean Smith and Calado later in the season. Webb achieved ten podiums over the course of the season. He also made his first foray into the Eurocup, taking part in the rounds in Barcelona and at Le Mans.

Formula Three
For the 2010 season, Webb continued to drive for Fortec, but stepped up to compete in the British Formula 3 Championship. Webb finished third in the championship with three wins, 14 podium finishes, and four fastest laps.

Formula Renault 3.5

For 2011 Webb signed with the Spanish Pons Racing team to race in Formula Renault 3.5. He finished 21st in the championship with five points finishes, scoring a best result of sixth in the final race at the Circuit de Catalunya.

Webb returned to the series in 2013 with Fortec Motorsport. Despite previously saying that he was not expecting to race single-seaters in 2014, it was announced that he would be returning to Pons Racing to race in Formula Renault 3.5 in 2014.

Indy Lights
Webb made his debut in the American Firestone Indy Lights series at the 2011 double-header at Edmonton for Jensen MotorSport. Webb finished on the podium in third in the first attrition-filled race and finished fifth in the second. He rejoined the team for the race in Baltimore where he crashed out after running in the top five and made his oval racing debut at the Las Vegas Motor Speedway season finale where he finished tenth.

Webb signed with Sam Schmidt Motorsports to compete in the 2012 Indy Lights season. Webb finished seventh in points and won the pole and finished on the podium in third place at Belle Isle, his best finish.

European Le Mans Series
In March 2014 it was announced that Webb would join Signatech to participate in their attempt to defend their LMP2 title alongside Nelson Panciatici and Paul-Loup Chatin, following a last-minute deal to race the 24 Hours of Daytona with OAK Racing. Oliver won the championship overall with wins and poles

World Endurance championship
Racing with Sard Morand, podium at Spa round 2.

Outside racing 
On 17 November 2019, Webb was announced as a W Motors Brand Ambassador and took part in the company's first track experience two days later. He will drive at W Motors events and assist in the development of their upcoming supercar.

On 10 October 2020, Webb drove a Shelby SuperCars (SSC) Tuatara in an attempt to set a new production car top speed record, hitting a claimed VMAX of 331.15 mph (532 km/h) and a two-way average of 316.11 mph (508 km/h) on a seven-mile stretch of closed road just outside of Las Vegas on State Route 160. Following an online controversy over the accuracy of the claimed speeds, SSC have stated that they will re-run the record attempt.

Racing record

Career summary

‡ After dropped scores.
† As Webb was a guest driver he was ineligible to score points.

Complete Formula Renault 3.5 Series results
(key) (Races in bold indicate pole position) (Races in italics indicate fastest lap)

American open–wheel racing results
(key)

Indy Lights

Complete British GT Championship results
(key) (Races in bold indicate pole position) (Races in italics indicate fastest lap)

† As Webb was a guest driver he was ineligible to score points.

Complete European Le Mans Series results

Complete 24 Hours of Le Mans results

Complete United SportsCar Championship results
(key) (Races in bold indicate pole position) (Races in italics indicate fastest lap)

Complete FIA World Endurance Championship results

† As Webb was a guest driver he was ineligible to score points.

References

External links
 
 
 

1991 births
Living people
English racing drivers
Sportspeople from Manchester
Formula BMW UK drivers
British Formula Renault 2.0 drivers
Formula Renault Eurocup drivers
Portuguese Formula Renault 2.0 drivers
Formula Renault 2.0 NEC drivers
British Formula Three Championship drivers
World Series Formula V8 3.5 drivers
Indy Lights drivers
Blancpain Endurance Series drivers
24 Hours of Daytona drivers
WeatherTech SportsCar Championship drivers
European Le Mans Series drivers
24 Hours of Le Mans drivers
24 Hours of Spa drivers
Asian Le Mans Series drivers
GP3 Series drivers
FIA World Endurance Championship drivers
24H Series drivers
British GT Championship drivers
Carlin racing drivers
Fortec Motorsport drivers
Pons Racing drivers
Arrow McLaren SP drivers
Signature Team drivers
OAK Racing drivers
Morand Racing drivers
Kolles Racing drivers
Strakka Racing drivers
McLaren Racing drivers